Khounsombath Phommaxay ຄຸນສົມບັດ ພົມມະໄຊ(born January 8 1998), is a Laotian footballer currently playing as a defender for Ministry of Health FC and the Laos national football team.

Career statistics

International

References

1988 births
Living people
Laotian footballers
Laos international footballers
Association football defenders